Buena Vista is an unincorporated community in Taylor Township, Harrison County, Indiana, in the United States.

History
Buena Vista was laid out in 1850. The community was named after the 1847 Battle of Buena Vista in the Mexican–American War. An old variant name was Convenience. A post office called Convenience was established in 1878, and remained in operation until 1904.

On March 28, 1859, a meteor exploded over the area and distributed meteorites over a 4 square mile area.  Only four Chondrite meteorites were recovered,  two of which are in a museum in London. Dr. Crosier collected and thoroughly analyzed the samples. His findings reported the people that found them, the location, composition, size and smell.

References

Unincorporated communities in Harrison County, Indiana
1850 establishments in Indiana
Unincorporated communities in Indiana
Populated places established in 1850